Yung Shue O is a village of Sai Kung North, in Tai Po District, Hong Kong, located near the shore of Three Fathoms Cove.

Administration
Fat Tau Chau is a recognized village under the New Territories Small House Policy.

Features
A section of Three Fathoms Cove located offshore of Yung Shue O is one of the 26 designated marine fish culture zones in Hong Kong.

Transport
A road connects Yung Shue O to Sai Sha Road.

A hiking path connects Yung Shue O to Sham Chung.

References

External links

 Delineation of area of existing village Yung Shu O (Sai Kung North) for election of resident representative (2019 to 2022)
 Antiquities Advisory Board. Historic Building Appraisal: Nos. 37, 38, 39, 40, 41 and 42 Yung Shue O Pictures
 Antiquities Advisory Board. Historic Building Appraisal: No. 43 Yung Shue O Pictures
 Antiquities Advisory Board. Historic Building Appraisal: 17, 18, 19 & 20 Yung Shue O (Four Houses) Pictures

Villages in Tai Po District, Hong Kong
Sai Kung North